Franz Almer (born September 23, 1970) is a retired Austrian goalkeeper who had managed GAK 1902 Amateure.

During his career, Almer made over 200 appearances for Grazer AK.

External links

1970 births
Living people
Austrian footballers
Grazer AK players
Association football goalkeepers
21st-century Austrian people